The Nambucca River is a river located in the Mid North Coast region of New South Wales, Australia.

Course and features
Nambucca River rises below Killiekrankie Mountain on the Dorrigo Plateau, part of the Great Dividing Range, and flows generally east southeast, joined by four tributaries including Taylors Arm, before reaching its mouth at the Tasman Sea of the South Pacific Ocean, at Nambucca Heads. The river descends  over its  course; adjacent to the towns of Bowraville, Macksville and Nambucca Heads.

The Nambucca River area has a fine subtropical climate, high rainfall and fertile volcanic soils. It was originally covered by rainforest, much of which has been cleared, although some rainforests remain in several national parks and reserves.  The lowlands along the river are used for farming.

Nambucca River is transversed by the Pacific Highway and the North Coast railway line, near Macksville.

See also

 List of rivers of Australia
 Rivers of New South Wales
 Taylors Arm
 Slim Dusty

References

External links
 

Rivers of New South Wales
Mid North Coast
Nambucca Shire